Parastathes moultoni is a species of beetle in the family Cerambycidae. It was described by Per Olof Christopher Aurivillius in 1914 and is known from Borneo.

References

Astathini
Beetles described in 1914